Fetești is a city in Ialomița County, Muntenia, Romania. It is located in the Bărăgan plain, on the Borcea branch of the Danube. Fetești has the second largest population in Ialomița, after Slobozia.

In 1895, the King Carol I railway Bridge was built across the Danube to Cernavodă. A newer one was built in the 1980s as part of the Bucharest-Constanța A2 highway.

History
The settlement of Fetești was first mentioned in the year 1528, in a document released by the ruler of Wallachia, Radu of Afumați. In 1868 Fetești became a commune, in 1934 a city, and 61 years later, in 1995, it achieved the status of municipality. In the course of time, Fetești has evolved to an important crossroads and industrial center.

Structure
The city is composed of four neighbourhoods: Fetești-Oraș, Fetești-Gară, Buliga and Vlașca; formally, the last three are separate villages. Fetești-Gară has a population of over 20,000 inhabitants, and it is considered to be the center of Fetești.

Education
There are 7 schools and 3 high-schools in the city. The "Carol I" high-school is the best in the Fetești-Țăndărei area, and one of the best in the county.

References

Populated places on the Danube
Populated places in Ialomița County
Localities in Muntenia
Cities in Romania